Sac County is a county located in the U.S. state of Iowa. As of the 2020 census, the population was 9,814. The county seat is Sac City. Both were named for the Sauk people, a local American Indian tribe.

In February 2007, in its third annual list of the “Best Places to Live in Rural America”, Progressive Farmer magazine placed Sac County as #7 in the overall rankings. In 2009, the magazine ranked Sac County as the tenth "Best Place" in the Midwest Region.

History
On January 13, 1846, the legislative body of the Iowa Territory authorized creation of twelve counties, with general descriptions of their boundaries. This brought the number of counties in the Iowa Territory to 22.

By the end of 1846, the territory had been accepted into the Union as the State of Iowa (December 28, 1846). By 1851, the new state had grown to the extent that the original 22 counties needed to be divided into smaller, more accessible units. Accordingly, on January 15, 1851, the Iowa General Assembly enacted an omnibus bill which created 43 new counties by reducing the previous counties. Sac County was named after the Sauk people, at that time called the Sac Indians.

It took some time for the new organization to fully function. Sac City was designated the county seat in 1856, and construction of the first county courthouse was complete in 1862. By 1873 the burgeoning population had outgrown that structure and a larger (85 x 56 feet brick) building was authorized to replace it.

The new courthouse, complete with impressive bell tower, was placed in service in January 1874, and was used until 1888 when it burned.

To replace that structure, the present courthouse was built. It was enlarged and remodeled in the 1980s.

Geography

Major highways
 U.S. Highway 20 – runs east–west through the northern part of the county, through Early and north of Sac City.
 U.S. Highway 71 – from its intersection with US 20 (east of Sac City), runs south, turns 4 miles east to Auburn, then continues south into Carroll County.
 Iowa Highway 39 – from its intersection with Iowa 175 at Odebolt, runs south into Crawford County.
 Iowa Highway 110 – from its intersection with US 20, runs north into Buena Vista County.
 Iowa Highway 175 – enters west side of county at Odebolt, runs east to intersection with US 71, east of Lake View.

Adjacent counties
Buena Vista County – north
Calhoun County – east
Carroll County – south and southeast
Cherokee County – northwest
Crawford County – south and southwest
Ida County – west
Pocahontas County - northeast

Demographics

2020 census
There were 5,118 housing units, of which 4,273 were occupied.

2010 census
There were 5,429 housing units, of which 4,482 were occupied.

2000 census

As of the census of 2000, there were 11,529 people, 4,746 households, and 3,198 families residing in the county. The population density was 20 people per square mile (8/km2). There were 5,460 housing units at an average density of 10 per square mile (4/km2). The racial makeup of the county was 98.53% White, 0.26% Black or African American, 0.09% Native American, 0.14% Asian, 0.02% Pacific Islander, 0.40% from other races, and 0.57% from two or more races. 0.96% of the population were Hispanic or Latino of any race.

There were 4,746 households, out of which 28.60% had children under the age of 18 living with them, 58.30% were married couples living together, 6.20% had a female householder with no husband present, and 32.60% were non-families. 29.40% of all households were made up of individuals, and 16.40% had someone living alone who was 65 years of age or older. The average household size was 2.37 and the average family size was 2.92.

In the county, the population was spread out, with 24.10% under the age of 18, 6.90% from 18 to 24, 23.50% from 25 to 44, 22.80% from 45 to 64, and 22.70% who were 65 years of age or older. The median age was 42 years. For every 100 females there were 95.50 males. For every 100 females age 18 and over, there were 91.80 males.

The median income for a household in the county was $32,874, and the median income for a family was $40,504. Males had a median income of $26,183 versus $19,753 for females. The per capita income for the county was $16,902.  About 6.80% of families and 9.90% of the population were below the poverty line, including 14.00% of those under age 18 and 8.20% of those age 65 or over.

Education
School districts include:
 Alta-Aurelia Community School District
 East Sac County Community School District
 Galva-Holstein Community School District
 Newell-Fonda Community School District
 Odebolt Arthur Battle Creek Ida Grove Community School District
 Schaller-Crestland Community School District
 South Central Calhoun Community School District
 Storm Lake Community School District

Three districts are based in the county: East Sac County School District (ESC) is the largest school district in Sac County, with the Schaller-Crestland School District serving the northwestern portion of the county and Odebolt-Arthur School District serving the southwest part. Successful completion of the curriculum of these schools leads to graduation from East Sac County High School, OA-BCIG High School, or Ridge View High School respectively. Only ESC HS is located in Sac County, with OA-BCIG HS in Ida Grove and Ridge View in Holstein.

Residents outside the three Sac County-based districts are within either the South Central Calhoun School District in areas around Lytton. A small part of northwestern Sac County is within the Galva–Holstein Community School District, which shares Ridge View High School with Schaller-Crestland SD.

Former school districts include:
 Odebolt-Arthur Community School District
 Rockwell City-Lytton Community School District
 Southern Cal Community School District
 Wall Lake View Auburn Community School District

Geocaching
Sac County is a rich area for geocaching. The county was "put on the map" when geocachers hid a series of caches a mile wide and 8 miles high to spell "SAC" along rural roads between Sac City and Lytton in August 2011.

Communities

Cities

Auburn
Early
Lake View
Lytton
Nemaha
Odebolt
Sac City (county seat)
Schaller
Wall Lake

Unincorporated community

Carnarvon

Townships

 Boyer Valley
 Cedar
 Clinton
 Cook
 Coon Valley
 Delaware
 Douglas
 Eden
 Eureka
 Jackson
 Levey
 Richland
 Sac
 Viola
 Wall Lake
 Wheeler

Population ranking
The population ranking of the following table is based on the 2020 census of Sac County.

† county seat

Politics
The Democrats have only carried Sac County a total of 5 times since 1912: 1932 and 1936 by Franklin D. Roosevelt, 1948 by Harry S. Truman, 1964 by Lyndon B. Johnson, and 1988 by Michael Dukakis. Most of these in Democratic landslides, with 1988 being the notable big exception as Dukakis overperformed here, as he had almost everywhere else in Iowa, due to the farm crisis of the 1980s.

See also

Sac County Courthouse
National Register of Historic Places listings in Sac County, Iowa

References

External links

 Sac County government's website

 
Iowa placenames of Native American origin
1851 establishments in Iowa
Populated places established in 1851